Plassmoen is a small village in Alvdal Municipality in Innlandet county, Norway. The village lies near the confluence of the rivers Folla and Sølna, just west of where the river Folla joins the large river Glåma. The population of the village in 2015 was 197.

References

Alvdal
Villages in Innlandet